Anthepiscopus is a genus of flies belonging to the family Empididae.

The species of this genus are found in Europe and Northern America.

Species:
 Anthepiscopus antipodus Bezzi, 1904 
 Anthepiscopus caelebs Becker, 1891

References

Empididae